The 2005 IIHF World U18 Championship Division III was an international under-18 ice hockey tournament run by the International Ice Hockey Federation. The Division III tournament made up the fourth level of competition at the 2005 IIHF World U18 Championships and took place between 7 and 13 March 2005 in Sofia, Bulgaria. The tournament was won by Australia who upon winning gained promotion, along with Belgium who finished in second place, to Division II of the 2006 IIHF World U18 Championships.

Overview

The 2005 IIHF World U18 Championship Division III began on 7 March 2005 in Sofia, Bulgaria. Bulgaria, Israel and New Zealand returned to compete in the Division III competition after missing promotion at the previous years World Championships. Australia and Belgium entered the Division III competition after being relegated from the Division II tournaments of the 2004 IIHF World U18 Championships and Turkey returned to Division III after winning the 2005 IIHF World U18 Championship Division III Qualification tournament that was held the previous month in Ankara, Turkey.

Australia finished first after winning all five of their games and gained promotion to Division II of the 2006 IIHF World U18 Championships. Belgium who finished in second placed also gained promotion to Division II and Israel finished in third place after losing only to Australia and Belgium. Oren Zamir of Israel finished as the tournaments top scorer after recording 17 points including ten goals and seven assists. Australia's Dahlen Phillips finished as the tournaments leading goaltender with a save percentage of 94.37.

Standings

Fixtures
All times local.

Scoring leaders
List shows the top ten skaters sorted by points, then goals.

Leading goaltenders
Only the top five goaltenders, based on save percentage, who have played 40% of their team's minutes are included in this list.

References

IIHF World U18 Championship Division III
III
International ice hockey competitions hosted by Bulgaria
IIHF World U18 Championship Division III